Bartramia is a genus of bird containing two species, the extant upland sandpiper and the extinct Bartramia umatilla from the Middle Pliocene of Oregon.

References

Bird genera
Bird genera with one living species
Sandpipers
Taxa named by René Lesson